Sea turtle migration is the long-distance movements of sea turtles (superfamily Chelonioidea) notably the long-distance movement of adults to their breeding beaches, but also the offshore migration of hatchings. Sea turtle hatchings emerge from underground nests and crawl across the beach towards the sea. They then maintain an offshore heading until they reach the open sea. The feeding and nesting sites of adult sea turtles are often distantly separated meaning some must migrate hundreds or even thousands of kilometres.

Several main patterns of adult migration have been identified. Some such as the green sea turtle shuttle between nesting sites and coastal foraging areas. The loggerhead sea turtle uses a series of foraging sites. Others such as the leatherback sea turtle and olive ridley sea turtle do not show fidelity to any specific coastal foraging site. Instead, they forage in the open sea in complex movements apparently not towards any goal. Although the foraging movements of leatherbacks seem to be determined to a large part by passive drift with the currents, they are still able to return to specific sites to breed. The ability of adult sea turtles to travel to precise targets has led many to wonder about the navigational mechanisms used. Some have suggested that juvenile and adult turtles might use the Earth's magnetic field to determine their position. There is evidence for this ability in juvenile green sea turtles.

Hatchling migration
Efficient movement of hatchlings away from the beach and shallow coastal waters is important in reducing the length of time that they are vulnerable to predators, which target the hatchlings on the beach or in shallow waters. Therefore, sea turtle hatchlings move offshore as an innate behaviour. The first part of the hatchling migration is called the 'frenzy period' which involves almost continuous swimming for the first 24–36 hours.

Orientation and navigation
Studies of loggerhead and leatherback hatchlings have shown that moonlight reflected from the sea is an important visual cue  in guiding movement from the beach to the sea. This navigational mechanism becomes a handicap if nesting sites are affected by artificial lighting since this can mean that hatchlings head towards the artificial lights rather than offshore towards the moonlit sea. Hence, the use of moonlight by turtle hatchings as a navigational cue can be considered an 'evolutionary trap'. Loggerhead and green turtles can detect the orbital movement of waves and use this information to swim perpendicular to the waves crests. This means they swim offshore, since close to the shore, wave crests run parallel to the beach. Further offshore the Earth's magnetic field is used to maintain an offshore direction and therefore head towards the open sea.

The ability to head in a given direction without reference to landmarks, is called a compass mechanism and where magnetic cues are used to achieve this it is called a 'magnetic compass'. Hatchling loggerheads mature within the North Atlantic Gyre and it is important that they stay within this current system since here water temperatures are benign. It has been shown that loggerheads use the magnetic field to stay within the gyre. For example, when exposed to fields characteristic of a region at the edge of the gyre they responded by orienting in a direction which would keep them within the gyre. These responses are inherited rather than learned since the hatchlings tested were captured before reaching the ocean. Adult turtles may learn aspects of the magnetic field and use this to navigate in a learned rather than innate way.

Post-hatchling migration

Juveniles often reside in coastal feeding grounds, as with green sea turtles and loggerheads. Adult sea turtles can be divided into 3 categories according to their movements. Leatherbacks and olive ridley turtles roam widely and unpredictably before returning to specific breeding sites. Satellite tracking of leatherbacks showed that they tended to stay within relatively food-rich areas of the ocean during their migration. Kemp's ridley sea turtles, loggerheads and flatback sea turtles migrate between breeding areas and a series of coastal foraging areas. Green sea turtles and hawksbill sea turtles shuttle between fixed foraging and nesting sites. Both species of ridley sea turtle nest in large aggregations, arribadas. This is thought to be an anti-predator adaptation — there are simply too many eggs for the predators to consume. One unifying aspect of sea turtle migrations is their ability to return to specific nesting sites over vast areas of ocean year after year. They may return to the beach where they hatched, an ability called natal philopatry; this has been demonstrated in green turtles using mitochondrial DNA analysis.

The precision migration of adults across featureless and dynamic oceans requires more than a compass mechanism, something Darwin pointed out in 1873: "Even if we grant animals a sense of the points of the compass ... how can we account for [green sea turtles] finding their way to that speck of land in the midst of the great Atlantic Ocean" [of the migration of green sea turtles from the coast of Brazil to Ascension Island, a journey of 2200 km to an island only 20 km in diameter]. An error in heading of only a few degrees would lead a turtle to miss the island by almost 100 km and animal compass analogues are not thought to be this precise. Moreover, a compass mechanism does not correct for current displacement since there is no position-fix.

Some have suggested that turtles use aspects of the Earth's magnetic field to gauge their position and in this way they could correct for displacement by currents or by an experimenter.

Green sea turtles

The post-nesting migration of adult female green sea turtles from Ascension Island to Brazil has been recorded using satellite transmitters as part of an experiment into their navigation. In addition to the transmitters, some turtles were fitted with magnets which were expected to disrupt any ability to use the Earth's field for navigation. There was no difference in migratory performance between these turtles and turtles which were not carrying magnets, but the experimental design has been criticised. There is strong evidence that green turtles are sensitive to magnetic cues. For example, juvenile green turtles exposed to fields north and south of a capture site (i.e. displaced in geomagnetic but not geographical space) oriented in a direction that would have led them back to the capture site, suggesting that they can use the earth's magnetic field to acquire positional information. Adult turtles also use magnetic cues. Whilst geomagnetic cues may guide navigation over long distances, close to the goal, it is thought that turtles use wind-borne cues emanating from the goal to home in on their target. Juvenile greens can orient using a 'sun compass'. In other words, they can use directional information to determine their headings.

Navigation methods

Turtle navigational skills for migrations remain unknown. There are several hypotheses including astronomical cues and the Earth's magnetic field. There is evidence that sea turtles do use a navigational compass when making long migrations.

The astronomical cue hypothesis is unsupported by scientific evidence. These cues would include light from the sun, moon, and stars. If sea turtles used astronomical cues, they would not be able to navigate in waters where light does not attenuate well, on cloudy days or when the moon is blocked by clouds. The moon is not a good astronomical cue because there is a new moon every 28 days. Narrowing out the astronomical hypothesis, the use of earth's magnetic fields can be viewed as the navigational tool for long-migration patterns of sea turtles.

Earth's magnetic field is used for migration for a wide variety of species including  bacteria, mollusks, arthropods, mammals, birds, reptiles, and amphibians. In order to understand the Earth's magnetic fields, the earth can be viewed as a large magnet. As a typical magnet has a north and south end, so does the earth. The north pole magnet is located at the Earth's north pole and the south pole magnet is located at the Earth's south pole. From this north and south pole span magnetic fields. The magnetic field leaves the poles and curves around the earth until it reaches the opposite pole.

In regards to the magnetic field hypothesis, there are three main concepts. The concepts include electromagnetic induction, magnetic field chemical reactions, and magnetite. In regards to electromagnetic induction, it is assumed that the sea turtles have electroreceptors. Although evidence has been found in other species such as rays and sharks, no evidence has shown that there are electroreceptors in sea turtles making this hypothesis invalid. A second concept  from the experimentation by Irwin involves chemical reactions commonly found in newts and birds. The strength of the magnetic field affects the chemical reactions within the bodies of the newts and birds. The final concept includes the magnetic crystals that form during the magnetic pulses from the earth's magnetic fields. These magnetic crystals formed by magnetite give the turtles directional information and guides in migration. The magnetite affects the cells of the nervous system of the sea turtle by producing a signal that references the forces of the magnetic field and the direction and magnitude that is applied. If this magnetite is used in the migration, when the earth's magnetic poles reverse at the dipole moment, the signal that the sea turtle nervous system receives will change the migration direction. Regardless of the hypothesis, hatchling turtles have the ability to determine the direction and inclination angle of which they are swimming with aide from magnetic fields.

References

External links
 The Lohmann Lab - research on se a turtle navigation

Sea turtles
Animal migration